Aleksander Kaar (6 May 1892 Lümanda Parish (now Saaremaa Parish), Kreis Ösel – 5 April 1943 Tavda, Sverdlovsk Oblast, Russian SFSR) was an Estonian politician. He was a member of I Riigikogu, representing the Estonian Labour Party. On 15 October 1921, he resigned his position and he was replaced by Friido Kirs.

References

1892 births
1943 deaths
People from Saaremaa Parish
People from Kreis Ösel
Estonian Labour Party politicians
Members of the Riigikogu, 1920–1923
Estonian people who died in Soviet detention
People who died in the Gulag